The Sea Cloud II is a large barque built as a cruise ship, and operated by Sea Cloud Cruises of Hamburg, Germany.

Concept and construction
Due to the success of the operator's first ship, Sea Cloud, but also for economic reasons, the operator decided to put another sailing ship into service.

Unlike the Sea Cloud, the Sea Cloud II is a newbuilding. The contract for her construction was awarded to the Spanish shipbuilder Astilleros Gondán, SA. The keel laying was held there on 24 June 1998.
 
The rigging was planned and produced by Navicom in Wolgast. The 23 sails were made in Poland.

Sea Cloud II was launched on 18 March 1999. However, the owner's exacting demands in relation to interior fitout caused delivery problems and personnel problems. This led to a roughly one-year delay. The ship was eventually handed over to Sea Cloud Cruises on 29 December 2000, in a not yet completely finished state.

On 22 January 2001, the final work was completed.  The Sea Cloud II was christened on 6 February 2001 in Las Palmas, Canary Islands. The sponsor was Sabine Christiansen.

Description

Hull
Her hull is built of standard shipbuilding steel, and is fitted with eight watertight bulkheads.

Three of the Sea Cloud II's decks are continuous.

Decks
The ship has five decks. The bridge deck is used as a sun deck behind the superstructure. Below it is the main deck, which is called the lido deck. It has a bar, lounge, the Owner Suites and the library.
 
The promenade deck, or first sub-deck, houses the reception area, restaurant, boutique, and the junior suites. Outside the windows of the suites is a promenade; no balconies are available. Externally, the Sea Cloud II is recognizable by the long "cutouts" in her hull.

The cabin deck is the second sub-deck. As its name suggests, it houses the cabins, but also a fitness room, sauna and a room for medical care. On the lowest deck are cabins for the crew members, along with the kitchen and other service facilities. A freight elevator connects the decks.

There is no pool aboard the Sea Cloud II. Instead, she has a foldable platform, which facilitates sea-based watersports.

Cabins and suites
In the cabins and suites, a maximum of 96 passengers can be accommodated. The interior of the Sea Cloud II is air conditioned, and in the cabins and suites, the temperature can be regulated.
 
There are 27 outside cabins with portholes. They are always equipped with two beds, and a TV, safe, shower, toilet and marble vanity tops with gold-plated taps, amongst other features. In the three interior cabins, the lowest category, there are bunk beds.

They also have more luxurious furnishings and interior decorations. The bathrooms are slightly larger than in the cabins and have a bath.

Rigging
The Sea Cloud II is a square-rigger with fore-mast, main-mast and mizzen-mast. She is sailed traditionally by hand, as is common, for example, on sail training ships.

Machinery
The vessel's main power plants consist of two four-stroke diesel engines made by Krupp MaK Maschinenbau GmbH, each developing  at 900 revolutions/minute. The propeller is driven via a gear mechanism. Using this means of propulsion, the Sea Cloud II achieves a top speed of about 13 knots. Additionally, she is equipped with a bow thruster.
 
Three main generators developing a total of  generate the on-board voltage of 380/220 V AC, 50 Hz. There is also a  emergency generator.

Service history

Cruise regions
The Sea Cloud II sails mainly in the Mediterranean in summer and in the Caribbean in winter. Her Atlantic crossings between these two regions are also marketed as cruises.

Rating
Comfort, service and cuisine are at the highest level on the Sea Cloud II. In 2004, the Berlitz Complete Guide to Cruising & Cruise Ships therefore gave her a five star rating.

Gallery

See also

 SV Hussar
 List of cruise ships
 List of large sailing vessels

References

External links

 Official website of Sea Cloud Cruises, the operator of the ship
 "Sea Cloud II" – review by Douglas Ward in The Daily Telegraph, London.
 "Sea Cloud II – Ship Review" – in Cruise Passenger.

Ships built in Spain
1999 ships
Barques
Cruise ships of Germany